Tin Kai-Man, also spelled Tin Kai-mun, is a Hong Kong actor and production manager, most notable for his role in Shaolin Soccer. A well-known friend of Stephen Chow, he began acting in his films with the 1994 Hail the Judge. Tin also worked with Chow on the actor and director's highly successful Kung Fu Hustle.

Filmography
Mr. Vampire (1985)
Mission Of Condor (1991)
Hail the Judge (1994)
The God of Cookery (1996)
Shaolin Soccer (2001)
My Lucky Star (2003)
Kung Fu Hustle (2004)
Marriage with a Fool (2006)
Nothing Is Impossible (2006)
Legendary Assassin (2008)
Lady Cop & Papa Crook (2009)
Just Another Pandora's Box (2010)
72 Tenants of Prosperity (2010)
3D Sex and Zen: Extreme Ecstasy (2011)
Due West: Our Sex Journey (2012)
Iceman (2014)
Lost in Hong Kong (2015)
The Mermaid (2016)

References

External links
 
 Hong Kong Cinemagic entry

1961 births
Hong Kong male film actors
Living people
Hong Kong male comedians